Mount Rotoiti is a  peak,  northeast of Mount Pukaki in the Frigate Range. It was named by the northern party of the New Zealand Geological Survey Antarctic Expedition (NZGSAE) (1961–62) for the New Zealand frigate, Rotoiti.

See also
Mount Wyss

Mountains of the Ross Dependency
Shackleton Coast